John Heath (born 5 June 1936; deceased 3 December 2019) was an English footballer who played as a goalkeeper in the Football League for Bury, Tranmere Rovers and Rochdale.

References

External links

Tranmere Rovers F.C. players
Bury F.C. players
Wigan Athletic F.C. players
Association football goalkeepers
English Football League players
Blackburn Rovers F.C. players
Rochdale A.F.C. players
1936 births
2019 deaths
English footballers